Scarborough Sixth Form College is located on the outskirts of Scarborough, North Yorkshire, England.

Background
The Sixth form college offers a variety of study courses to around 1,000 mostly 16- to 19-year-olds. Courses range from level 2 (GCSE) to level 3 (Advanced Level and BTEC). A 2001 Ofsted inspection described the college as "a particularly successful college", being rated 23rd in a list of the United Kingdom's most successful colleges in that year.

An Ofsted inspection from 2016 said the college was a "good college" and it "displays elements that are outstanding".

Students take AS or A2 (A-Level) qualifications, as well as BTECs and GCSEs.

In 2012 the college opened a new study space called "The Hub"; it was opened by former students, Howard Wilson and Toby Jepson.

The £3 million refit of the college, including the library facility, was fully completed in November 2012.

Notable former students 

Eliza Carthy, folk musician
John Fendley, television presenter & former producer of Soccer AM
Clive Holland, presenter of BBC One's Cowboy Trap
Toby Jepson, singer and songwriter
Melanie Leng, isotope geoscientist
Mikey North, actor in Coronation Street
Timothy Sheader, artistic director at Regent's Park Open Air Theatre
Little Angels, hard rock band of the late 1980s to mid-1990s
Howard Wilson, professor of plasma physics
Gavin Williamson, Conservative MP former Secretary of State for Defence, and former Secretary of State for Education

References

External links
Scarborough Sixth Form College website

Education in Scarborough, North Yorkshire
Sixth form colleges in North Yorkshire
Buildings and structures in Scarborough, North Yorkshire
Educational institutions established in 1973
1973 establishments in England